Olusola Bandele Oyewole (born 30 September 1955) is a Nigerian  professor of  Food science and technology, educational administrator, and former  vice chancellor of  Federal University of Agriculture, Abeokuta.

Education
Oyewole attended Odo-Otin Grammar School, Osogbo in Osun State, Nigeria. 
He obtained a Bachelor of Science (B.sc) degree in 1981 from Obafemi Awolowo University. He later proceeded to the prestigious University of Ibadan, where he obtained a Master of Science (M.sc) degree in 1984 and a Doctorate (P.hD) degree in Food science and technology.

Life and career
He was born in Kaduna State, Nigeria on 30 September 1955 but  hails from Abeokuta, in Ogun State, Nigeria. He began his career in 1985 as a lecturer in the department of Food science and technology at University of Agriculture, Abeokuta, where he later became the head of the department. He is one of the Nigerian academicians that has contributed significantly to education in Nigeria. Prior to his appointment as the vice chancellor of  Federal University of Agriculture, Abeokuta, he has served at different levels of academic organization. He was the Project Officer of the World Bank project on Quality Assurance for African Higher Education systems at the Association of African Universities for three years ( 2006 – 2009) at the Association of African Universities.

False allegation
On 25 November 2016, he along with the Pro Chancellor, Senator Adeseye Ogunlewe, and the former Bursar, Mr. Moses Ilesanmi, were wrongly arraigned before an Ogun State High Court in Abeokuta over N800 million fraud allegations against them by the EFCC
But in May 2018, he along with the others accused were discharged and acquitted by the Ogun state high court for lacking merits. The Judge ruled that the allegations were without any merit.

See also
List of vice chancellors in Nigeria

References

1955 births
Living people
Academic staff of the Federal University of Agriculture, Abeokuta
Food scientists
Obafemi Awolowo University alumni
People from Kaduna State
University of Ibadan alumni
Vice-Chancellors of Federal University of Agriculture, Abeokuta